Sentenced for Life is an Australian film directed by E. I. Cole. It was an adaptation of a play performed by Cole and his Bohemian Dramatic Company as early as 1904.

It is considered a lost film.

Plot
A man is wrongly convicted and sentenced as a convict. According to a contemporary report, "Vivid convict scenes are enacted, ending with a revolt by the prisoners. There is a happy ending of wedding bells." It turns out the young man's rival was responsible and he is punished.

Chapter headings were:
the Favourite;
it did look suspicious
the Blackmailer, 
Outlaw and the Child, 
Slight Breeze, 
Malaysia, 
General Commotion, 
Blighted Hopes, 
Manufacture of Almonds

Cast of theatre production
In 1911 the cast of a theatre production of the play in Geelong was listed as follows:
E. I. Cole as Mr. Bertram, 
Mr. Frank Mills as Richard Hayward, 
W. S. Marshall as Jabez Ooh
J. R. Wilson as Sammy Traddles
Vene Linden as Mary Bertram
It is highly likely at least some of these actors repeated their performance in the film.

References

External links
 
Sentenced for Life at AustLit

1911 films
Australian black-and-white films
Australian silent short films
Lost Australian films